Peter McGillivray is a Canadian operatic baritone and winner of the 2003 CBC/Radio-Canada Young Performers Competition. Born in Prince Albert, Saskatchewan, he was raised in Newmarket, Ontario and attended the University of Toronto.

Education and training 
An alumnus of the University of Toronto Faculty of Music's Opera Division, he made his debut with the Canadian Opera Company in 2003 as a member of the Ensemble Studio training program. His primary vocal instructors were the Canadian soprano Lynn Blaser and Welsh mezzo-soprano Patricia Kern.

Peter attended Huron Heights Secondary School in Newmarket, Ontario

Career 
McGillivray has performed Dr. Bartolo in Rossini's Barber of Seville with companies such as Opera Lyra Ottawa, Pacific Opera Victoria, Opera de Québec and Calgary Opera. He is a collaborator with Toronto's Tapestry Opera, premiering works such as Andrew Staniland's Dark Star Requiem, Omar Daniel's The Shadow and the Dora Award-winning production of Gareth Williams' Rocking Horse Winner, and adaptation of the short story by D.H Lawrence. Recent years have also seen him perform with Edmonton Opera and Vancouver Opera as Don Magnifico in Cinderella, with Dallas Opera as Stubb in Jake Heggie's Moby Dick, and with both Opéra de Québec and Saskatoon Opera as Sharpless in Puccini's Madama Butterfly.

Awards

Discography 

*Nominated for a Juno award

References

External links 
 

1976 births
Living people
Musicians from Saskatchewan
Musicians from Ontario
People from Prince Albert, Saskatchewan
People from Newmarket, Ontario
Canadian operatic baritones
21st-century Canadian male singers